TIDC may refer to :
Tripura Industrial Development Corporation
tumour-infiltrating dendritic cells